Pandering may refer to:

Pandering (politics), the expression of one's views in a manner that appeals to voters
Procuring (prostitution), the facilitation of a prostitute